My Mirror is a 2021 Nigerian movie produced by Jumoke Odetola and directed by Gboyega Ashowo. The movie addresses the different kinds of abuse suffered by men and it stars Seun Akindele, Odunlade Adekola and Afeez Owo.

Plot 
The movie addresses the belief of the society that men must not expressed their feelings and pains. This notion made men to suppress their agonies which can eventually depressed them.

Premiere 
The movie was premiered on 6 June 2021 in Lagos State. The premiering was attended by celebrities such as Ayo Adesanya, Mr Macaroni, Seun Akindele, Korede Bello, Femi Adebayo, Ben Touitou,  Jide Awobona, Owen Gee, Gt Da Guitarman and Rotimi Salami.

Cast 

 Seun Akindele,
 Odunlade Adekola,
 Afeez Owo Abiodun,
 Ayo Olaiya
 Allwell Ademola

See also
List of Nigerian films of 2021

References 

2021 films
English-language Nigerian films
Nigerian drama films